The Elkhorn Mountains are a mountain range, part of the Blue Mountains in the northwest United States.

The Elkhorn Mountains are partly within the Wallowa–Whitman National Forest and the North Fork John Day Wilderness.

See also
List of mountain ranges of Oregon

References

External links

Elkhorn Crest National Recreation Trail #1611: U.S. Forest Service
Elkhorn Range from Hoffer Lakes near Anthony Lake: hiking guide by William Sullivan

Mountain ranges of Oregon
Mountain ranges of Baker County, Oregon
Mountain ranges of Grant County, Oregon
Landforms of Union County, Oregon
Elkhorn Mountains, Oregon